John Muir Branch Library is a branch library of the Los Angeles Public Library.  It was built in 1930 based on a design by architect Henry F. Withey.

In 1987, the Muir Branch and several other branch libraries in Los Angeles were added to the National Register of Historic Places as part of a thematic group submission.   The application noted that the branch libraries had been constructed in a variety of period revival styles to house the initial branch library system of the City of Los Angeles.

Following damage to the building in a series of earthquakes, the library temporarily relocated to a mini-mall in 1987.  The historic library was reopened in 1997.

See also

 List of Registered Historic Places in Los Angeles
 List of Los Angeles Historic-Cultural Monuments in South Los Angeles
 Los Angeles Public Library

Notes

References
 "South-Central; Historic Library Branch to Open After Renovation," Los Angeles Times, November 6, 1997.
 "After the Riots: REBUILDING Grant Awarded to Library Branches," Los Angeles Times, June 18, 1992.
 "Lee Side O'L.A.," Lee Shippey, Los Angeles Times, August 18, 1930.
 "Library Branch Site Bought and Plans Ordered," Los Angeles Times, May 2, 1929.

Library buildings completed in 1930
Libraries in Los Angeles
Libraries on the National Register of Historic Places in Los Angeles
Los Angeles Historic-Cultural Monuments
Spanish Revival architecture in California